The Prostate is a peer-reviewed medical journal devoted to the anatomy, physiology, and pathology of the prostate gland. The editor-in-chief is Samuel Denmeade (Johns Hopkins University).

Publications established in 1980
Andrology journals
Prostate